The Royal College of Defence Studies (RCDS) instructs the most promising senior officers of the British Armed Forces, His Majesty's Diplomatic Service and Civil Service in national defence and international security matters at the highest level, to prepare them for the top posts in their respective services. It forms part of the Defence Academy of the United Kingdom, and is its most senior and prestigious component. In addition, there are many overseas attendees, from countries who are close allies of the United Kingdom.

It was known as the Imperial Defence College from its foundation in 1927 until 1970.

History
In 1922, a cabinet committee under Winston Churchill, then Secretary of State for the Colonies, recommended the formation of the College. The college was founded in 1927 as the Imperial Defence College and was located at 9 Buckingham Gate until 1939. Its objective at that time was to instruct senior military officers the defence of the British Empire. In 1946, following the end of World War II, the college reopened at Seaford House, Belgrave Square and members of the United States Armed Forces started attending the course for the first time.

It was renamed the Royal College of Defence Studies in 1970. In 2007 the Queen and Prince Philip visited the college.

RCDS Course
The RCDS Mission is:

"To prepare senior officers and officials of the United Kingdom and other countries, and future leaders from the private and public sectors, for high responsibilities in their respective organisations, by developing their analytical powers, knowledge of defence and international security, and strategic vision."

RCDS forms a part of the Defence Academy of the United Kingdom. In fulfilment of its mission, the college runs one course a year, from September to July. Each course is attended by a maximum of 90 full-time members, around one-third from the UK and two-thirds from overseas. Attendees are military officers of Colonel/Brigadier or equivalent rank, and also include Home Office and Ministry of Defence civil servants, Foreign Office diplomats, police officers and a few representatives from the private sector. All members would have been selected to attend the course on the strength of their potential to progress to high positions within their professions.

The course composition has been progressively widened to include members from over 40 countries. Graduates of the college are entitled to the post-nominal letters rcds, while prior to 1970 the post-nominal letters idc were used.

Since 2001, course members have had the option of studying in a joint programme that leads to an MA in International Security and Strategy from King's College London.

Commandants
The College is led by the Commandantcurrently Sir George Norton. The Commandant leads the Senior Directing Staff of the College, who are in effect the faculty and are a mixture of active and retired military officers, diplomats and civil servants.

Alumni

References

External links
Royal College of Defence Studies

1927 establishments in the United Kingdom
Staff colleges
Military training establishments of the United Kingdom
King's College London